Bobbie L. Sterne (November 27, 1919 – November 22, 2017) was an American politician who served two terms as the Mayor of Cincinnati, from 1975–1976 and 1978–1979.

Early life and education 
Sterne was born on November 27, 1919, in Moran, Ohio, and grew up in Portage County, Ohio. She earned a nursing degree from the Akron City School of Nursing. During World War II, Sterne was a member of the 25th General Hospital Division and served in England, France, and Belgium. After the war, Stere settled in North Avondale, Cincinnati with her husband.

Career 
Sterne was elected to the Cincinnati City Council in 1971 and served continuously until 1998 with the exception of a two-year hiatus.

A member of the Charter Party, she was Cincinnati's second female mayor, after Dorothy N. Dolbey. She has previously served as a long-time member of the Cincinnati City Council. She retired from the council in 1998 and was succeeded by Jim Tarbell.

Personal life 
Sterne and her husband, Dr. Eugene Sterne, had two children before Eugene's death in 1977. Bobbie died on November 22, 2017, in Santa Cruz, California, five days before her 98th birthday.

References

External links
Finding Aid for Bobbie Sterne papers, Archives and Rare Books Library, University of Cincinnati, Cincinnati, Ohio

1919 births
2017 deaths
Mayors of Cincinnati
Women mayors of places in Ohio
Charter Party politicians
American nurses
21st-century American women